John P. Sunderbruch (November 9, 1949 – August 4, 2017) was an American politician in the state of Iowa.

Sunderbruch was born in Davenport, Iowa. A Republican, he served in the Iowa House of Representatives from 1999 to 2001 (44th district).

He died of cancer on August 4, 2017, in Davenport, Iowa.

References

1949 births
2017 deaths
Politicians from Davenport, Iowa
Republican Party members of the Iowa House of Representatives
20th-century American politicians
21st-century American politicians
University of Iowa alumni